Mustapha Zulfikar is a Guyanese politician. He is the current Minister of Agriculture in Guyana. He was appointed minister on August 5, 2020 by President Irfaan Ali.

Education 
Mustapha Zulfikar has a degree in management from the University of the West Indies.

Career 
Zulfikar started his career working as Assistant General Secretary of the Guyana Agricultural and General Workers Union (GAWU) between 1989 and 2002. In 2003, he ran for the Guyana National Assembly and was elected that same year. He was elected for a three-year tenure which ran from 2003 to 2006. After his tenure as Member of parliament, he was subsequently appointed Regional Chairman for Region Six and was in office till 2011. In 2015, he was elected Member of Parliament till 2020.

On August 5, 2020 he was appointed Minister of Agriculture by President Irfaan Ali.

References 

Living people
Members of the National Assembly (Guyana)
University of the West Indies alumni
Year of birth missing (living people)
Government ministers of Guyana
Guyanese people of Indian descent